William Fraser (1778 or 1779 Strathglass, Inverness-shire Scotland – October 4, 1851 Arichat, Nova Scotia, Canada) was a Canadian Roman Catholic priest and the first Bishop of Halifax in Nova Scotia from 1842 to July 20, 1845. He was Bishop of Arichat from September 22, 1844 (now the Diocese of Antigonish). The difference in the dates is due to the splitting of the diocese into two dioceses effective September 22, 1844, and Fraser remaining Bishop of Halifax until such time that William Walsh took formal possession of the Diocese of Halifax.

In folklore
In both Scottish and Canadian folklore, Bishop Fraser is a folk hero. He is said to have been a man of enormous physical strength and to have been able to break steel horseshoes with his bare hands. On both sides of the Atlantic Ocean, many legends have been collected of the Bishop's exploits.

In Canadian literature
 Despite his devotion to the Catholic Faith, poet Ailean a' Ridse MacDhòmhnaill, a major figure in Scottish Gaelic literature and that of Canadian Gaelic, sharply opposed Bishop Fraser's decision to forcibly introduce the Catholic temperance movement into the Diocese of Arichat. In Ailean a' Ridse's 1854 Canadian Gaelic poem Òran dhan Deoch, ("A Song to Drink"), which he set to the air Robai Dona Gòrach, he declared himself a believer in, "The creed of Bacchus". Ailean a' Ridse also lamented the loss of merriment caused by the Church's bans against music and alcohol, while also lamenting the damage that he had seen alcoholism cause in his own family and among many other families like them.
 Despite their differing views over alcohol, following Bishop Fraser's death, Ailean a' Ridse MacDhòmhnaill composed the poem Cumha do' n Easguig Friseal ("Lament for Bishop Fraser"), which MacDhòmhnaill set to the air A' bliadhna leum dar milleadh. According to Effie Rankin, Ailean a' Ridse adapted the traditional verse iconography of a Highland clan mourning for the death of their Chief to the Catholic Gaels of the Diocese of Arichat mourning for the death of their Bishop.

References

Further reading
 A. A. Johnston, A History of the Catholic Church in Eastern Nova Scotia, Vol. II, St. Francis Xavier University Press, Antigonish, N.S., 1971.
 
 
 Diocese of Antigonish

1778 births
1779 births
1851 deaths
19th-century Roman Catholic bishops in Canada
Canadian folklore
People from Cape Breton Island
Roman Catholic bishops of Antigonish
Roman Catholic bishops of Halifax
Scottish emigrants to pre-Confederation Nova Scotia
Scottish folklore
Tall tales